Non-Quasi Static model (NQS) is a transistor model used in analogue/mixed signal IC design.  It becomes necessary to use an NQS model when the operational frequency of the device is in the range of its transit time.  Normally, in a quasi-static (QS) model, voltage changes in the MOS transistor channel are assumed to be instantaneous.  However, in an NQS model voltage changes relating to charge carriers are delayed.

References 

Electronic engineering
Transistor modeling